Davy Gysbrechts (alternatively spelled Davy Gjisbrechts; born 20 September 1972) is a Belgian retired footballer.

Career
Gysbrechts started his career with KV Mechelen.

Gysbrechts retired after playing 19 games for Sheffield United between 1999 and 2002. He was linked with a move back to Mechelen which never materialised.

Gysbrechts now works in the 'Green Service' in his home country.

References

External links 
Davy Gijsbrechts geniet ook als bankzitter met volle teugen van avontuur in Sheffield
«Mijn supporters gaan weer naar KV Mechelen»
Vergeten speler : Davy Gysbrechts 
Dutch Wikipedia Page 
 
 

Living people
1972 births
Belgian footballers
Belgian expatriate footballers
Sheffield United F.C. players
Association football defenders
K.V. Mechelen players
K.S.C. Lokeren Oost-Vlaanderen players
Expatriate footballers in England
Belgian expatriate sportspeople in England